The Women's World Chess Championship 2017 was a 64-player knock-out tournament, to decide the women's world chess champion. The final was won by Tan Zhongyi over Anna Muzychuk in the rapid tie-breaks.

At the FIDE General Assembly during the 42nd Chess Olympiad in Baku in September 2016, the organizational rights to the event were awarded to Iran, who held the Championship in Tehran from 10 February to 4 March 2017.

Some top female players decided not to attend the tournament. Hou Yifan, the outgoing women's world champion and top ranked female player, decided not to enter the tournament because of dissatisfaction with FIDE's Women's World Championship system. The 2015 Women's World Champion, Mariya Muzychuk, and US Women's Champion Nazí Paikidze also elected not to attend, out of protest at the tournament's location in Iran, where it is mandatory for all women to wear a hijab in public (a rule which also applied to the participating players). Other notable absentees were women's world number four Humpy Koneru and eight-time US Women's Champion Irina Krush.

On 12 May 2017 FIDE suspended the Chess Federation of Iran for non-payment of Women's World Championship prizes. On 2 June 2017, the ban was lifted.

Hosting
The tournament was originally placed on the FIDE calendar for October 2016. However, the March 2016 meeting of the FIDE Presidential Board ultimately postponed the event to 2017 due to a lack of organizer.

The original agenda for the General Assembly made no explicit mention of Iran, only indicating that the event had been postponed until 2017 due to the lack of an organizer, similar to the situations in 2014 and 2015. When the agenda item (5.20.7) for Women's World Championship came up for discussion in Baku, Iran offered to host the event, and after a brief discussion of the applicable dress code, none of the 159 attending delegates objected. Only when FIDE published the General Assembly decisions two weeks later the existence of the Iran offer become widely known, and the issue rapidly became explosive, in part due to the social media activity of Nigel Short, who alternatively claimed that awarding the event to Iran was against FIDE Statutes or the Code of Ethics (or founding Principles) of the International Olympic Committee.

Nazí Paikidze, who qualified by finishing tied for 2nd in the 2015 US Women's Championship, was the first female player to protest FIDE's decision to allow Iran to host the event. Through the media she has announced that she will not participate most particularly because of Iran's dress code requiring women to wear a hijab, though initially she also secondarily mentioned the risks to Americans and other foreigners of being detained in Iran because of their nationality. In a later petition on Change.org she included a third item, namely that there could be speech restrictions on women.

Chess, like other sports, has had a degree of controversy regarding women's attire. A statement from FIDE Press Officer Anastasiya Karlovich was published at Susan Polgar's site Chess Daily News on October 1, 2016, indicating that FIDE has not received any official complaints to date (including from prior women's events held in Iran), but that they would be reviewing all possible solutions for the players’ comfort and would discuss all the issues with the organizers in Iran during meetings in the next few weeks. Polgar requested that concerned participants contact the FIDE Women's Commission, of which she is co-chair.

Emil Sutovsky, the president of the Association of Chess Professionals (ACP), hosted discussions at his Facebook page on the matter, and wrote an official letter to FIDE. He also noted that while he has talked to at least half the participants and the vast majority do not want to boycott, the ACP would respect the rights of others too. Natalia Zhukova, Alexandra Kosteniuk, Anna Muzychuk, and Elisabeth Paehtz have all made public comments to Sutovsky, but none to the degree of Nazí Paikidze. Sutovsky was willing to entertain Nigel Short's claims regarding the illegality of FIDE's actions, but simultaneously would not pursue them (either personally or as ACP president) until a proper legal argument was made on the matter.

ChessBase India interviewed two of the three qualifiers from that country (Harika Dronavalli and Humpy Koneru), each of whom has played in Iran previously. They indicated a degree of awkwardness and discomfort with the physical aspects of the headscarf while playing (as had Zhukova), but declared the World Championship itself to be more important. Later articles quoted Kosteniuk and Koneru expanding on their views, with the former noting that even exercising for fitness in Iran can be difficult for a woman.

The Guardian featured 2015 Asian Women's Continental Champion Mitra Hejazipour (of Iran) in an article, describing how a boycott could harm Iranian women's sport. Other Iranian players have also stated that a boycott would not be beneficial to Iranian women.

Schedule
The schedule of the tournament:
 February 10: Opening ceremony
 February 11–13: Round 1
 February 14–16: Round 2
 February 17–19: Round 3
 February 20–22: Round 4 (quarter-finals)
 February 23–25: Round 5 (semi-finals) 
 February 26: Rest day 
 February 27 – March 3: Round 6 (final) 
 March 4: Closing ceremony

Participants
The players are selected by five different means: reaching the semi-finals of the most recent knock-out Women's World Championship, junior championships, rating, zonal or continental chess championships, and FIDE wildcards.

Before the start of the tournament, 48th seed Cristina Adela Foișor died. Because pairings were already announced, there was no replacement.

The participants, seeded by their FIDE rating of February 2017, are:

Qualification paths

Prize money
The prize money is US$3,750 for first round losers, $5,500 for second, $8,000 for third, $12,000 for fourth, $20,000 for losing semifinalists, $30,000 for runner-up, and $60,000 for champion ($450,000 overall), with 20% of such sums being taken by FIDE. All players pay their own costs (travel, accommodation and meals) for the duration.

Final match

The final was the only match of the tournament which consists of four classical games. Those were played on consecutive days with a rest-day between the semi-final tie-breaks and match 1. Eventual tie-breaks were played on 3 March 2017, in the same manner as the whole tournament. Two rapid games of 25+10 (i.e. 25 minutes for the whole game plus 10 seconds increment), the two rapid games of 10+10, two blitz games of 5+3 and an armageddon decider.

Anna Muzychuk, the reigning women's blitz and rapid world champion, had advanced to the final without playing a tie-break. Tan Zhongyi on the other hand played several, including two armageddon matches. One of those in the semi-final against Harika Dronavalli, who had been knocked-out at semi final stage for the third straight time. Before the finals, Tan Zhongyi and Anna Muzychuk had met each other just two times at classical time-control, with both games ending in a draw.

After a draw in the first game, Tan outplayed her opponent to win game 2, however Muzychuk came back with a crushing early victory in game 3. Game 4 was a quiet draw, setting the stage for a rapid playoff. In the first pair of rapid games, Tan Zhongyi won the title. Consequently, she was also awarded the Grandmaster title.

{| class="wikitable" style="text-align:center"
|+Women's World Chess Championship Final 2017
|-
! colspan=2| !! colspan=4|Classical games !! colspan=2|Tie-breaks !! rowspan=2|  Total
|- 
! !! Rating !! 1 !! 2 !! 3 !! 4 !! R1 !! R2
|-
| align=left |  || 2502 || style="background:black; color:white"| ½ || 1 ||style="background:black; color:white"| 0 || ½ ||style="background:black; color:white"|½ || 1  || 3½
|-
| align=left |  || 2558 || ½ ||style="background:black; color:white"| 0 || 1 ||style="background:black; color:white"| ½ || ½ ||style="background:black; color:white"|0 || 2½
|}

Bracket
Player positions are determined by the January FIDE rating list. No. 1 plays no. 64, 2 plays 63, and so on.

References

External links
Official website

Women's World Chess Championships
2017 in chess
Sport in Tehran
2017 in Iranian sport
Chess in Iran
International sports competitions hosted by Iran
February 2017 sports events in Asia
March 2017 sports events in Asia